The ArtCar Museum is a private museum of contemporary art located in Houston, Texas, United States. The museum, nicknamed the "Garage Mahal," opened in February, 1998. Its emphasis is on art cars, fine arts, and artists that are rarely seen in other cultural institutions. The museum's mission is to elevate awareness of the political, economic, and personal dimensions of art.

The museum was founded by Ann Harithas, artist and long-time supporter of the Art Car movement, and James Harithas, former director of the Corcoran Gallery of Art, Washington, D.C., the Everson Museum of Art, Syracuse, New York, the Contemporary Arts Museum Houston and current director of the Station Museum, Houston, Texas.

The museum showroom celebrates the spirit of this post-modern age of car-culture, in which artists have remolded stock cars to the specifications of their own idiosyncratic images and visions. The museum features elaborate art cars, lowriders, and mobile contraptions, as well as organizing a number of temporary exhibitions by local, national, and international artists, some accompanied by catalogs, such as a retrospective of the social/political, pointillist paintings by Houston artist Ron Hoover (1944-2008) held in 2010. and a survey of the work of artist John Atlas in 2014.

It is located at 140 Heights Blvd, Houston, TX 77007.

See also
 Art car
 Houston Art Car Parade
List of museums in the Texas Gulf Coast

References

External links
 ArtCar Museum website
 Station Museum website

Art museums and galleries in Texas
Museums in Houston
Modern art museums in the United States
Automobile museums in Texas
1998 establishments in Texas
Art museums established in 1998